Bellencombre is a commune in the Seine-Maritime department in the Normandy region in northern France.

Geography

Population

Places of interest
 The church of St. Pierre, dating from the nineteenth century.
 The church of St. Martin, dating from the twelfth century.
 The chapel of St. Christophe, dating from the sixteenth century.
 The gothic chapel, dating from the thirteenth century.
 A sixteenth-century stone cross.
 The sixteenth-century château de La Grande Heuze
 The three châteaux: de La Crique; de La Quaine and Mont-Roty.

See also
Communes of the Seine-Maritime department

References

Communes of Seine-Maritime